Chen Zifan (born 17 September 1995) is a Chinese professional snooker player.

Chen is among ten Chinese players currently suspended from the professional tour amid a match-fixing investigation. In January 2023, he was charged with fixing matches on the tour.

Career
Chen Zifan started to play snooker aged 10, helped by his uncle, who ran a club in Xi'an. At first, his parents were reluctant, but after showing great talent, they allowed him to quit mainstream school at the age of 11 to concentrate on snooker. In 2008, Chen won third place in Chinese National Junior Championship.

Coached by former professional Liu Song, he began playing in minor-ranking Asian Players Tour Championship events. In 2012 he reached the last 64 in the Event 1 in Zhangjiagang where he lost 4–2 to Michael White.

In 2013, he won the China Youth Championship, beating Lu Ning. His strong results in junior tournaments earned him a wildcard  appearance at the World Open. There he defeated Sanderson Lam before losing 5–0 to Judd Trump in the last 64. He was also a wildcard at the China Open, where he was defeated 5–2 by compatriot Yu Delu. He also qualified for the 2016 International Championship, defeating professional Tian Pengfei 6–3, and only narrowly losing in the first round to 6–5 to Liang Wenbo.

He moved to Shenzhen, where he was coached by Roger Leighton at the Wiraka Academy.

Between 2014 and 2017, Chen came very close to professional qualification. He finished 5th on the Asian Order of Merit in 2014-15 and 3rd in the Chinese amateur rankings in 2015-16 - in both cases just one place short of qualification. He also had an unsuccessful attempt at Q School in 2016. Chen described these near-misses as 'very painful'.

Chen Zifan finally turned professional for the 2017–18 season after defeating Ben Jones 4–1 in the final round of Q-School, Event 2.

2017/2018 season 
Chen's first match as a professional resulted in a 4-2 win over Ross Muir to qualify for the Riga Masters. However, a VISA problem meant he was unable to travel to the main competition. He followed this with a 5-3 win over Dominic Dale in the China Championship. His best wins of the season were against Barry Hawkins and Shaun Murphy.

Chen's first World Championship was a major disappointment. After the first session he trailed 9-0 against Noppon Saengkham. On resumption he won a respotted black to avoid the whitewash, punched the table in relief, and was warned by the referee. Saengkham won the match 10-1. Chen finished the season ranked 105.

2018/2019 season 

Chen's second season was a disaster. He won only 3 of his 20 matches, including 2 against amateurs. But he again beat Barry Hawkins (in the Northern Ireland Open). He finished the season ranked 101 and was relegated from the tour.

In May, Chen Zifan came through Q-School - Event 2 dropping only 3 frames in his six matches to earn a new two-year card on the World Snooker Tour for the 2019–20 and 2020–21 seasons.

2019/2020 season 

At the Riga Masters Chen reached the last-16 for the first time by beating Andres Petrov and Ben Woollaston. He then lost to Yan Bingtao.

With the COVID-19 outbreak, the snooker season was suspended and Chen returned to China. Facing a multitude of travel and administrative hurdles, Chen did not return until the start of the next season, missing the World Championship. He finished the season ranked 105.

2020/2021 season 

Chen's best performance was a run to the 3rd round of the UK Championship, after 6-5 victories over Yuan Sijun and Yan Bingtao. He then lost 6-1 to Anthony McGill, but the ranking points gained played a major part in his tour survival. The following week at the Scottish Open he lost 4-0 to Mark King without potting a single ball.

At the World Championship, he needed a win to ensure professional survival via the 1-year list. This he achieved by beating Mitchell Mann 6-5, once again punching the table. He then lost 6-1 to Stuart Bingham. Chen finished the season ranked 76.

Personal life 
During the season, Chen Zifan lives in Sheffield where he practices at the Victoria Snooker Academy, managed by Victoria Shi.

Performance and rankings timeline

References

External links

Chen Zifan at worldsnooker.com
Chen Zifan at CueTracker.net: Snooker Results and Statistic Database
Profile on Snooker.org

1992 births
Sportspeople from Xi'an
Living people
Chinese snooker players
20th-century Chinese people
21st-century Chinese people